Cal Ingraham is an American retired ice hockey coach and right wing who was an All-American for Maine and helped the program win its first National Championship in 1993.

Career
Ingraham began attending the Air Force Academy in the fall of 1989. His career path changed after he was able to score more than a point per game as a freshman and he transferred after the season. He sat out for the required scholastic year and appeared in his first game for Maine in the fall of 1991. He played well for a very strong Black Bears squad but the team faltered once they got into the NCAA Tournament, losing their first game to Michigan State.

Everything changed when the team added Paul Kariya for the following season. Ingraham teamed with the future Hall of famer on the top line along with Jim Montgomery and got Maine to produce one of the most overpowering campaigns in NCAA history. The Black Bears won just about everything in 1993, finishing the year with a NCAA record 42 wins and losing just a single game. Ingraham led the nation with 46 goals, finishing 4th overall in scoring and was one of five All-Americans on the team. After winning the national championship, Ingraham returned for his senior season, serving as team captain after Kariya left to pursue a professional career. Predictably the team was a bit flat but things got worse when Maine was forced to forfeit 14 games for using an ineligible player. Maine finished dead-last in their conference as a result and ended the season by getting swept in the Hockey East quarterfinals.

After graduating, Ingraham took a year off before returning to the game. He instantly became a major point producer for the Tallahassee Tiger Sharks, becoming the all-time leading scorer for the now-defunct franchise. He played three seasons with the team but didn't receive any interest from higher-level teams despite his gaudy scoring totals. He signed on with the Idaho Steelheads in 1998 and went on to become the franchise leading scorer for a second team. For three consecutive seasons he scored 50 goals and 100 points for the Steelheads. Ingraham also helped the team reach the Taylor Cup Finals in his final two seasons, retiring following the 2002 championship.

After hanging up his skates, Ingraham remained in Idaho and became a coach. He eventually worked his way up to becoming the head coach for Boise State University, heading the club team from 2011 to 2017.

Statistics

Regular season and playoffs

Awards and honors

References

External links

1970 births
Living people
Ice hockey coaches from Massachusetts
People from Georgetown, Massachusetts
American men's ice hockey defensemen
Air Force Falcons men's ice hockey players
Maine Black Bears men's ice hockey players
AHCA Division I men's ice hockey All-Americans
NCAA men's ice hockey national champions
Tallahassee Tiger Sharks players
Idaho Steelheads (WCHL) players
Boise State Broncos coaches
Ice hockey players from Massachusetts
Military personnel from Massachusetts